Alvarado is a canton in the Cartago province of Costa Rica. The head city is in the Pacayas district.

History 
Alvarado was created on 9 July 1908 by decree 28.

Geography 
Alvarado has an area of  km² and a mean elevation of  metres.

The defunct Atlantic railway line delineates a portion of the southern boundary of the oval-shaped canton, along with the Reventazón River. The Turrialba River on the east and the Birrís River on the west help establish the canton's northern limits, which reach into the Cordillera Central (Central Mountain Range).

Districts 
The canton of Alvarado is subdivided into the following districts:
 Pacayas
 Cervantes
 Capellades

Demographics 

For the 2011 census, Alvarado had a population of  inhabitants.

Transportation

Road transportation 
The canton is covered by the following road routes:

References 

Cantons of Cartago Province
Populated places in Cartago Province